Jankowice Rybnickie  is a village in Rybnik County, Silesian Voivodeship, in southern Poland. It is the seat of the gmina (administrative district) called Gmina Świerklany.

The village has a population of 3,900.

References

Villages in Rybnik County